Mount Agassiz, at , is one of the twenty highest peaks of California. It is the northernmost and easiest to climb of the major Palisades summits. This peak is not to be confused with the 9967 ft peak by the same name in Desolation Wilderness, also in the California Sierra.

Geography
Agassiz is at the north end of the Palisades in the eastern Sierra Nevada, near Bishop Pass. It stands on the boundary between Kings Canyon National Park and Inyo National Forest, and Fresno and Inyo counties.

History
In 1879, Lilbourne Winchell named it Agassiz Needle for Harvard University professor of zoology and geology Louis Agassiz. Later, the USGS recognized it by its current name.

The peak is named after Swiss-American scientist Louis Agassiz. The name Agassiz Needle was originally applied to another nearby peak in 1879, likely Mount Winchell, but at some point the name moved to the current peak.

Climbing
There are three major routes to Agassiz's summit. The easiest is the west slope, both for its non-technical ascent and proximity to the Bishop Pass Trail. From South Lake, the trail climbs gently to Bishop Pass, and the summit route begins there. An attempt to ascend from the west via a chute can lead off route, to areas requiring more technical mountaineering skills and equipment.

Another class 2 scrambling route is the southeast face by way of the south ridge, from Agassiz Col.

A more technical route is the northeast face, which requires class 4 climbing. Norman Clyde established it by following a canyon, couloir and arête from Fifth Lake.

See also
 Mountain peaks of California
 Palisades of the Sierra Nevada

References

External links
 

Mountains of Kings Canyon National Park
Mountains of the John Muir Wilderness
Mountains of Fresno County, California
Mountains of Inyo County, California
Mountains of Northern California